Euphemia of Greater Poland (c. 1230 – 15 February after 1281), was a Polish princess member of the House of Piast from the Greater Poland branch and by marriage was Duchess of Kalisz, Wieluń and Opole-Racibórz.

Euphemia was the youngest child of Władysław Odonic and his wife Jadwiga, disputed daughter of Mestwin I, Duke of Pomerania and Swinisław, daughter of Mieszko III the Old.

Euphemia's date of birth is unknown. In literature it claims Euphemia was born around 1230. It is most likely she was born between (1226–1230), fitting in with the dates of birth of her siblings and dates of death of her parents.

Marriage 
Euphemia and her siblings married well. Her brother Przemysł I of Greater Poland married Elisabeth, daughter of Henry II the Pious. Another brother Bolesław the Pious married Helen, daughter of Béla IV of Hungary. Euphemia's only sister, Salome of Greater Poland married Konrad I, Duke of Silesia-Glogau.

Euphemia married in 1251 Władysław Opolski, son of Casimir I of Opole and Viola, Duchess of Opole. The couple were related in the fourth degree, so they needed a papal dispensation in order for the marriage to be considered valid. It is unknown whether the couple got a papal dispensation.

The marriage was to help bring closer ties between the two Piast branches and for political reasons to do with Euphemia's brother Przemysł.

Władysław and Euphemia had five children:
Mieszko I (b. 1252/56 – d. by 27 June 1315).
Casimir (b. 1253/57 – d. 10 March 1312).
Bolko I (b. bef. 21 October 1258 – d. 14 May 1313).
Constance (b. 1256/65 – d. by 1351), married by 1280 to Henry IV Probus, Duke of Wrocław; they were divorced in 1286.
Przemysław (b. ca. 12 June 1268 – d. 7 May 1306).

In 1258, Euphemia and her husband funded a Cistercian in Rudy. In 1281 they gave money to Premonstratensians.

Euphemia died 15 February during a year after 1281, apparently in 1287. She is buried in Silesia

Ancestors

References

Piast dynasty
13th-century Polish people
13th-century Polish women
1230 births
13th-century deaths
People from Greater Poland